Xabier Eskurza García (born 17 January 1970) is a Spanish former professional footballer who played as a right midfielder.

Career
Progressing through the youth system of Athletic Bilbao, Eskurza made his professional debut in the 1989–90 season in a 2–0 win over Celta on 17 September 1989. After strong performances in the 1993–94 season, he failed to reach an agreement for a contract renewal and signed with Johan Cruyff's Barcelona in a swap deal with Jon Andoni Goikoetxea.

However, Eskurza would only play one season for the club due to, in part, the fact that he had suffered a serious injury after the first matchday of the season, sidelining him for four months. After his return to action, he played 15 games, but at the end of the season he signed with Valencia, where he spent two seasons. For the 1997–98 season, he moved to Mallorca with whom he reached the Copa del Rey final, missing the last penalty of the shootout. In 1998, Eskurza joined Oviedo where his career was cut short in 2000, at just 30 years old, due to hip injuries.

After his retirement, he became a player representative.

Honours
Barcelona
Supercopa de España: 1994

Mallorca
Copa del Rey runner-up: 1997–98

References

External links

1970 births
Living people
People from Greater Bilbao
Sportspeople from Biscay
Spanish footballers
Footballers from the Basque Country (autonomous community)
Association football midfielders
La Liga players
Segunda División players
Segunda División B players
Bilbao Athletic footballers
Athletic Bilbao footballers
FC Barcelona players
Valencia CF players
RCD Mallorca players
Real Oviedo players
Spain youth international footballers
Spain under-21 international footballers
Spain under-23 international footballers
Basque Country international footballers
Asti Leku Ikastola alumni